TV6 (Six) is a Polish free-to-air television channel, owned by Polskie Media (subsidiary of Polsat Group). From 1 January 2014 Telewizja Polsat is a direct broadcaster of TV6. It was launched on 30 May 2011.

Later on 30 April 2013, TV6 gained a new graphic design and a new visual identity. Also in the idents the logo is 3D. On 1 January 2014 Telewizja Polsat become so far acquiring TV6, and its main channel TV4.

Programming 
TV6's programming consists of entertainment, reality shows and quiz shows, which the Polish versions have gained popularity, as well as animated television series for children, sports and adults, situation comedy and music.

See also 
 TV4
 Television in Poland

References 

Television channels in Poland
Television channels and stations established in 2011
Polsat